The Kibong-dong hovercraft base (기봉동) is a base of Korean People's Army Naval Force located in North Pyongan Province, North Korea.

History
Kibong-dong was constructed in the 1980s.

Hovercraft
Kibong-dong has sheds which could house approximately 52 hovercraft vessels. The hovercraft sheds were constructed between 2000 and 2003. Hovercraft were last observed in March 2013 Google Earth imagery, since that date free to use imagery has shown little evidence of activity of any kind.

References

Military installations of North Korea
Korean People's Navy